Mithras, the god at the centre of the Roman mystery religion Mithraism
 Mythras, a re-branding of the sixth edition tabletop role-playing game RuneQuest

See also
 Mithras (disambiguation)